is a Japanese musician, actor and former lead singer of The Checkers born in Kurume. His younger brother is Naoyuki Fujii, a musician and former sax player for The Checkers. His eldest son is Fuji TV announcer Kōki Fujii. He formerly belonged to Yamaha Music Foundation and Three Star Pro (both during the Checkers era), and now he is part of a private agency, FFM Co.

Biography
Fujii was born as the first child to a father who was a Japanese National Railways employee and a mother who was a beautician. When he was a junior high school student, he encountered the Japanese rock band CAROL and started playing music. After graduating from Nanchiku High School, he joined the Moji Railway Administration Bureau of the Japan National Railways (now Kyushu Railway Company), and after a six-month apprenticeship at Tosu Station, he worked as a freight train operator at Haiki Station, maneuvering and switching freight trains. He belonged to the National Railway Workers' Union (Kokurō).

In 1983, after retiring from the Japanese National Railways, Fujii made his debut as the lead singer of The Checkers and had many hits. Not only his singing ability, but also his appearance and behavior attracted attention, and more and more young people imitated his progressive fashion. He also wrote lyrics for most of the original songs released as singles, and became a central figure in songwriting. In 1992, The Checkers disbanded, and the following year, 1993, Fujii changed the spelling of his first name from kanji to katakana, and started his solo career. Naoyuki Fujii, his younger brother, was also a part of The Checkers and began pursuing a solo career as well. Together they did the project F-Blood in the late 1990s. At the time of the breakup, Fujii was invited to the U.S. by Gota Yashiki, who was living in Los Angeles at the time. Kenji Suzuki, who also lived in Los Angeles, chose him and bought him a Gibson B-25 guitar. The first song he composed using this guitar was "True Love". The song, released the same year, sold 2.4 million copies, and "Another Orion", released in 1996, sold over 1.2 million copies.

In addition to singing, he has held solo exhibitions under the name "FUMIYART" and produced the Nagoya City Pavilion "Tower of the Earth" for Expo 2005 (recognized by the Guinness Book of Records as the world's largest kaleidoscope). He has also appeared in many TV dramas, and provided the voice of Rock Holmes for the 2003 Astro Boy series, in addition to writing and singing its ending theme "Boy's Heart."

His songwriting credits include "Shiroi Kumo no Youni" (composed by Naoyuki Fujii) for the band Saruganseki and "Hoshizora no Katasumi de" (lyrics and composition) for Misia. He has also produced four songs, including "Heart-Shaped Tears" for Hinano Yoshikawa. His many contributions to the local community include composing the Kurume song "Furusato no Sasayaki" for his hometown Kurume, Fukuoka Prefecture, providing the design for the Kurume Citizen Card, creating the logo for Fukuoka Broadcasting Corporation, and designing the uniform for his alma mater Nanchiku High School. The nickname of Kagoshima City FM, the first community radio station to open in Kagoshima Prefecture on October 1, 1997, "FRIENDS FM 762," was named by Fujii. He has also designed the countdown T-shirts for the 1998 Winter Olympics. The T-shirts were engraved with the number of days remaining until the day of the 1998 games, and Fujii was in charge of designing the shirts from 500 to 401 days before the games.

In 2007, Fujii wrote the lyrics and composed the song "Chinju no Sato" in praise of the 62nd Jingū Shikinen Sengū. It is included in the single "Kimi ni Naru." He stayed in Ise, Mie for three days and composed the song on the riverbank of the Isuzu River near the Uji Bridge.

On December 31, 2008, at a countdown live performance at the Nippon Budokan, Fujii tied with Eikichi Yazawa for first place with 102 performances, including performances during the Checkers era, under the name F-BLOOD, and as a solo artist. In response, he said that he was honored to have stood on the same stage as Yazawa at the Budokan since CAROL (with Yazawa) was the reason why he started his music career.

In November 2019, Fujii opened an official channel on YouTube.

Discography

Singles
 "True Love" (November 10, 1993)
 "Eros" (April 1, 1994)
 "Time Machine" (April 21, 1995)
 "Heart Break" (August 2, 1995)
 "Get Up Boy" (November 17, 1995)
 "Girl Friend" (April 22, 1996)
 "Another Orion" (August 7, 1996)
 "Snow Crystal" (November 21, 1996)
 "Do Not" (May 7, 1997)
 "Go the Distance" (July 18, 1997)
  (August 1, 1998)
  (May 12, 1999)
 "Moonlight Magic" (November 20, 1999)
 "Stay with me" (April 19, 2000)
 "Inside" (May 10, 2000)
 "Upside Down" (May 23, 2001)
  (July 18, 2001) – Japanese ending theme song to Pokémon 4Ever
 "All This Love" (December 12, 2001)
 "Seven Wonders" (May 22, 2002)
 "Boy's Heart" (May 21, 2003)
 "Thrill up" (April 21, 2004)
  (November 10, 2004)
  (April 27, 2005)
 (November 9, 2005)
  (July 12, 2006)

Albums
 Rock'en Roll (June 7, 1995)
 Tears (September 20, 1996)
 Standard (December 16, 1996, Pony Canyon)
 Pure Red (June 18, 1997)
  (October 1, 1998) (Reissued in 2001 on CD by Sony Japan
 Singles (best of album) (November 18, 1998)
 2000–1 (July 1, 1999)
 In and Out (July 5, 2000)
 Club F (June 20, 2001)
 Equal (June 19, 2002)
 The Party Remix (July 31, 2002)
 Re Take (October 9, 2002)
 My Carol (March 26, 2003)
 Right Here Right Now CD (June 18, 2003, Smej Associated 2348)
 Lady Sister Baby (October 22, 2003)
 Cloverfield (May 19, 2004)
 Pop Star (September 29, 2004)
  (June 29, 2005)
 With The Rawguns (September 20, 2006)

References

External links
 
 
 

1962 births
Japanese pop musicians
Living people
Musicians from Fukuoka Prefecture
People from Kurume
Sony Music Entertainment Japan artists
Japanese male actors
20th-century Japanese male singers
20th-century Japanese singers
21st-century Japanese male singers
21st-century Japanese singers